The following is a list of pipeline accidents in the United States in 2011. It is one of several lists of U.S. pipeline accidents. See also list of natural gas and oil production accidents in the United States.

Incidents 
 On January 11, personnel from Millennium Pipeline noticed that a gas transmission pipeline was leaking in Tioga County, New York. This 30-inch diameter pipeline was built in 2008. A pinhole in a rejected girth weld was found to be the cause of the failure. It appears that during the course of the construction project for the line, the subject pipe section was inadvertently picked up and subsequently installed in the pipeline. PHMSA ordered testing of this pipeline for similar flaws.
 A 12-inch cast iron gas main leaking in Philadelphia exploded, killing a repair crew member and injuring six others on January 18.
 Multiple gas pressure regulators failed, and caused a gas pressure surge in Fairport Harbor, Ohio, on January 24, causing gas fires in 11 houses, and one apartment. 150 gas appliances were damaged or destroyed, but there were no injuries. Gas company Dominion East Ohio says it found fluids and debris in a failed regulator. A year after the explosion, the Public Utilities Commission of Ohio recommended a $500,000 fine for Dominion.
 Five people were killed, and eight houses were destroyed, in a gas explosion and fire in Allentown, Pennsylvania on February 9. The NTSB had warned UGI about cast iron gas mains needing replacement after the 1990 gas explosion in that city. Between 1976 and the date of the letter, July 10, 1992, two more gas explosions occurred. Three people were killed, 23 injured and 11 houses were destroyed or damaged in those explosions. UGI was cited in 2012 for several safety violations, including a lack of valves on their gas system.
 Late on February 10, a Tennessee Gas Pipeline 36-inch gas transmission pipeline exploded and burned near Lisbon, Ohio. No injuries resulted. The cause was from stress on a girth weld on the pipeline. A failure on another girth weld on the pipeline system led to a PHMSA Consent Agreement.
 On March 1, a Tennessee Gas Pipeline gas transmission pipeline failed near Cumberland, Ohio. A material or weld defect was the cause.
 Early on March 17, a 20-inch steel CenterPoint Energy natural gas line running through a Minneapolis, Minnesota neighborhood ruptured, and gas from it ignited, caused evacuations to buildings nearby, and Interstate 35W was closed from downtown Minneapolis to Highway 62. There were no injuries. The Minnesota Office of Pipeline Safety later found the pipe there was not designed to handle the load of soil and passing cars, and efforts to shore up the pipeline were incorrectly carried out.
 A farmer and rancher near White Oak Township, Michigan smelled gasoline on April 13, and discovered gasoline from a products pipeline leaking into a drainage ditch. As of late September, an estimated 460,000 gallons of gasoline had been released, with about 111,000 gallons of it recovered.
 On May 7, a threaded connection failed on a Keystone Pipeline pump at a station in Sargent County, North Dakota, spilling about 400 barrels of crude oil. Due to a number of other leaks on this pipeline system, Keystone's owner, TransCanada Corporation, was given a Corrective Action Order by PHMSA.
 An 8-inch NGL pipeline failed in Romeoville, Illinois on May 14, leaking about 4200 gallons of butane. Corrosion inside a casing under a road was the cause of the failure. Corrosion only 2.5 feet from the failure had been seen by a smart pig run in 2007, but was not within action limits at the time.
 On May 19, a 10-inch crude oil pipeline ruptured near Maysville, Oklahoma. Over  of crude were lost. There was no fire. Internal pipeline corrosion was the cause.
 A 2-inch lateral on a crude oil pipeline ruptured in Huntington Beach, California on July 1. A major road, Goldenwest Street, had to be closed for cleaning and pipeline repairs.
 Late on July 1, a 12-inch Exxon Mobil crude oil pipeline. also known as the Silvertip Pipeline, ruptured, and spilled about 63,000 gallons of oil into the Yellowstone River in south-central Montana. There was confusion in the pipeline control room, causing a delayed pipeline shutdown. Some residents of Laurel, Montana had to be evacuated. The break near Billings fouled the riverbank and forced municipalities and irrigation districts to close intakes. Exxon later increased the spill size estimate to 1500 barrels in January 2012 after seeing the damage to the pipeline. About 140 people were evacuated starting about 12:15 a.m. Saturday due to concerns about possible explosions and the overpowering fumes. All were allowed to return after instruments showed petroleum odors had decreased, although no information was available regarding the concentrations of benzene in air. Speculation involves high water flow in the Yellowstone River may have scoured the river bed and exposed the pipe. Consequently, with three oil refineries located in the Billings area, the fire chief for the city of Laurel said he asked all three to turn off the flow of oil in their pipelines under the river after the leak was reported. Exxon Mobil and Cenex Harvest Refinery did so, and Conoco Phillips said  that its pipe was already shutdown. Cenex had a release into the Yellowstone River in September 2002. Exxon Mobil later announced the cleanup would cost $135 million. In 2015, Exxon Mobil was fined $1 million by PHMSA for this incident.
 On July 20, a six-month-old, 30-inch natural gas pipeline exploded near Gillette, Wyoming, creating a  crater. There was no fire, nor any injuries. Construction or installation issues caused the failure.
 A pipeline carrying jet fuel ruptured in Mango, Florida on July 22. About  of fuel spilled. There was no fire or injuries.
 On August 13, an 8-inch NGL pipeline ruptured near Onawa, Iowa at a Missouri River crossing, during flooding conditions. About 818 barrels of Natural Gasoline was lost. There were no evacuations or injuries, but two other pipelines in the same right of way were forced to shut down.
 On August 17, Kinder Morgan's Natural Gas Pipeline Company of America had a flash fire and explosion at a plant south of Herscher, Illinois. Five employees went to the hospital. Kinder Morgan was later cited for pipeline and workplace safety violations.
 A pipeline carrying heating oil was hit by construction workers in East Providence, Rhode Island on August 31, spraying oil on roofs, trees, and pavement, and flowed into storm drains. At least  of oil were spilled.
 A Cupertino, California condominium was gutted August 31, after a plastic pipeline fitting cracked, filling the garage with natural gas that exploded just minutes after the owner left for lunch. PG&E later found six other plastic pipe failures near the blast site. The line was an especially problematic type of pipe manufactured by DuPont called Aldyl-A. PG&E has  of the early-1970s-vintage pipe in its system. Federal regulators singled out pre-1973 Aldyl-A starting in 2002 as being at risk of failing because of premature cracking. Explosions caused by failed Aldyl-A and other types of plastic pipe have killed more than 50 people in the United States since 1971, the federal government says.
 In September, a 12.75 inch crude oil pipeline developed a leak under the Red River, in Temple, Oklahoma.
 A 10-inch LPG pipeline failed on September 8, in Mitchell County, Texas. The escaping gas ignited, starting a small brush fire. The cause of the failure was a crack in the weld of a repair sleeve from bending and heat hardening. About 546,000 gallons of LPG burned. There were no injuries.
 On September 18, a house explosion and fire in Dallas, Texas was caused by a leaking gas main. 3 people were injured.
There was no fire or injuries.
 A 2-inch crude oil gathering pipeline failed in Oklahoma on October 12, spilling about 120 barrels of oil. There were no injuries or fire from the failure.
 Early on November 3, an explosion and fire hit a gas Columbia Gas Transmission pipeline compressor station at Artemas in Mann Township, Bedford County, Pennsylvania. There were no injuries. The cause was internal corrosion.
 On November 8, a contractor for Vectren Corp. working on a bare gas main replacement project broke a "short stub" on the main, then failed to notify New Albany, Indiana authorities about the leak. Gas migrated through the soil, and built up in a nearby house, then exploded. Five people had to be hospitalized.
 A crew working on a waterline hit a gas distribution pipeline in Fairborn, Ohio on November 12, leading to a gas explosion that killed one man, and injured five others, including children.
 On the evening of November 13, 2011, a release of nearly 1798,000 gallons of diesel fuel occurred at the Belle Fourche Pipeline Company’s Davis Station in a remote area of Wyoming. The cause was from pumping against a closed valve on the pipeline. 
 On November 16, a Tennessee Gas Pipeline 36-inch gas transmission pipeline exploded and burned near Glouster, Ohio. Two people were injured, with three houses and a barn destroyed, and another barn damaged. The pipeline failed at a girth weld, with landsliding causing more stress on the weld.
 Late on November 21, a Tennessee Gas Pipeline 24-inch gas transmission pipeline exploded and burned near Batesville, Mississippi. Twenty houses were evacuated for a time, but there were no injuries or major property damage. The pipeline failed at a sleeve over a wrinkle bend installed in 1946.
 On December 3, a Williams Companies gas transmission pipeline exploded and burned in Marengo County, Alabama. A 47-foot section of the pipe was hurled more than 200 feet from the failure area. The gas burned for several hours, and a nearby pipeline was damaged. There were no injuries, or serious property damage. External corrosion was the cause of the failure, due to issues with the pipeline coating, the cathodic protection level, and the local soil corrosiveness.
 On December 6, explosions and fire erupted at a natural gas pipeline compressor station in Sublette County, Wyoming. Two workers were injured.
 On December 10, a landowner using a bulldozer hit an 8-inch and a 12-inch petroleum pipelines near Nemaha, Nebraska, rupturing both lines. The spill size was estimated to be 119,000 gallons of gasoline, jet fuel, and diesel fuel. Some of the fuel flowed into a creek leading into Jasper Creek. There were questions about the depth of soil coverage for this pipeline.
 A 42-inch natural gas transmission pipeline failed and ignited at a valve on December 10 in Cache County, Utah.
 On December 27, controllers for Enterprise Products received an alarm, for a leak on an LPG pipeline. The leak location was found in Loving County, Texas. Repair crew excavated the area, and found a full girth weld failure. During the pipeline repair, a flash fire involving residual pipeline product in the soil occurred, injuring 3 employees, one of whom required in-patient hospitalization. The rupture was attributed to the complete circumferential separation of an acetylene girth weld dating to 1928, and the flash fire was attributed to operator error.

References 

Lists of pipeline accidents in the United States
2011 disasters in the United States